The Bohol Northern Star Colleges or  BNSC is a private non-sectarian co-educational institution of higher learning in Ubay, Bohol, Philippines. The institution is located at barangay Poblacion near the Catholic Cemetery.

It was established as the Bohol Northeastern Colleges in 1996. It is the only surviving college to be established in the municipality of Ubay.

Course offerings

Undergraduate courses

Bachelor in Elementary Education
Bachelor in Secondary Education, major in:
English
Mathematics
Bachelor of Science in Accountancy (BSA)
Bachelor of Science in Accounting Technology (BSAct)
Bachelor of Science in Business Administration (BSBA),  major in:
Financial Management
Marketing Management
Management Accounting
Bachelor of Science in Criminology (BSCrim)
Bachelor of Science in Entrepreneurship (BSE)
Bachelor of Science in Hotel & Restaurant Management (BSHRM)
Bachelor of Science in Information Technology (BSIT)
Bachelor of Science in Information System (BSIS)
Bachelor of Arts (AB), major in:
Political Science
Psychology
Continuing Professional Education (CPE)

Associate diplomas

Diploma in Industrial Technology, major in: 
Automotive
Electricity
Electronics
Diploma in Technology Education, major in: 
Automotive
Electricity
Electronics

TESDA WTR registered programs

Automotive Servicing NC-II
Building Wiring Installation NC-II
Consumer Electronic Servicing NC-II
Computer Hardware Servicing NC-II
Tourism (ladderized to BSHRM)
Front Office Services NC-II
Commercial Cooking NC-II
Baking/Pastry Production
Housekeeping NC-II
Bartending NC-II
Shielded Metal Arc Welding NC-II
Gas Metal Arc Welding NC-II

Basic education
Bohol Northeastern Education Foundation
 Complete Elementary
 Complete High School

References

External links
 Official Website of Bohol Northern Star Colleges

Ubay, Bohol
Universities and colleges in Bohol